Yuri wa Aoku Saite (百合は蒼く咲いて) is the fourth maxi single by Japanese band Alice Nine. It was released on May 25, 2005. The single was released with a DVD containing the music video for "Yuri wa Aoku Saite."

Both songs on the single were later released on Alice Nine's third EP, Kasou Musou Shi.

Track listing
Yuri wa Aoku Saite (百合は蒼く咲いて; Lilies Bloom Palely) – 5:08
Seija no Parade (聖者のパレード; Parade of the Saints) – 4:15

Bonus DVD
Yuri wa Aoku Saite (百合は蒼く咲いて; Lilies Bloom Palely)

External links
 PS Company Official Website
 King Records' Official Website

2005 singles
Alice Nine songs
2005 songs
King Records (Japan) singles
Song articles with missing songwriters